Herbert Edward Terrick Haultain (9 August 1869 – 19 September 1961) was a Canadian engineer and inventor.

He was born in Brighton, England and died in Toronto, Ontario. He graduated from the University of Toronto with a degree in civil engineering from the School of Practical Science (now the Faculty of Applied Science and Engineering) in 1889. He was largely responsible for the creation of the Ritual of the Calling of an Engineer administered to many Canadian engineering students, where they receive the Iron Ring. The Haultain building at the University of Toronto is named for him and he is an inductee of the Canadian Mining Hall of Fame.

In the 1920s 20% to 30% of the Canadian graduating classes in engineering were emigrating to the United States.  In 1927 Professor Haultain and Robert A. Bryce, president of Macassa Mines and a noted mining engineer, co-founded the Technical Service Council, a non-profit, industry-sponsored organization.  Its aim was to retain engineers for Canada by operating a placement service for them.  In 1971, the Council's executive search arm, Bryce, Haultain & Associates, was named after them. He died in 1961, and was buried in Little Lake Cemetery in Peterborough, Ontario, with several other family members.

External links 
 
 Note about Haultain  Canadian Mining Hall of Fame
 Herbert Edward Terrick Haultain  at The Canadian Encyclopedia
Archival papers of Herbert Edward Terrick Haultain and the Ritual of the Calling of an Engineer are held at the University of Toronto Archives and Records Management Services

1869 births
1961 deaths
Canadian civil engineers
University of Toronto alumni
Canadian mining businesspeople
Canadian inventors
People from Brighton